Shri Shivajirao Bapusaheb Deshmukh (1 September 1935 – 14 January 2019) was the Chairman of the state of  Maharashtra's Legislative Council in India.

He was elected to Maharashtra Legislative Council in 1996 and 2002.

He was earlier elected to Maharashtra Assembly in 1978, 1980, 1985 and 1990.

His son Shri Satyajit Shivajirao Deshmukh is an elected Director of Sangli District Central Co-operative Bank  and former Vice president of District Council Sangli.

References 

1935 births
2019 deaths
People from Sangli district
Maharashtra MLAs 1978–1980
Maharashtra MLAs 1980–1985
Maharashtra MLAs 1985–1990
Maharashtra MLAs 1990–1995
Chairs of the Maharashtra Legislative Council
State cabinet ministers of Maharashtra
Marathi politicians